Olympic records are the best performances in a specific event in that event's history in either the Summer Olympic Games or the Winter Olympic Games, including:

 Archery (list)
 Alpine skiing (records recognized only by FIS)
 Athletics (list)
 Biathlon (cross-country portion only)
 Bobsleigh (records recognized only by FIBT)
 Cycling (list)
 Cross-country skiing
 Diving 
 Football (men's & women's records)
 Freestyle skiing (records only kept in ski cross)
 Luge
 Nordic combined
 Rowing (list)
 Shooting (list)
 Short track speed skating (list)
 Skeleton (records recognized only by FIBT)
 Ski jumping
 Speed skating (list)
Sport climbing
 Snowboarding (records not kept in halfpipe and slopestyle)
 Swimming (list)
 Triathlon (records recognized only by ITU)
 Weightlifting (list)

See also

Commonwealth Games records

References

External links
 International Olympic Committee list of Olympic Records

 
records
Olympic